Social equality is a state of affairs in which all individuals within a specific society have equal rights, liberties, and status, possibly including civil rights, freedom of expression, autonomy, and equal access to certain public goods and social services. Social equality requires the absence of legally enforced social class or caste boundaries and the absence of discrimination motivated by an inalienable part of an individual's identity. For example, advocates of social equality believe in equality before the law for all individuals regardless of sex, gender, ethnicity, age, sexual orientation, origin, caste or class, income or property, language, religion, convictions, opinions, health, or disability. Social equality is related to equal opportunity.

Definition 
Social equality is variously defined and measured by different schools of thought. These include equality of power, rights, goods, opportunities, capabilities, or some combination of these things. It may also by defined in comparison to distributive equality, power structures between individuals, or justice and political egalitarianism. Societies that promote social equality generally do not make distinctions of rank or social class, and interpersonal relationships under a system of social equality are generally based on the ideal of mutual respect and equal value rather than hierarchy or honour. Many different ideologies draw from ideas of social equality, including communism, anarchism, multiculturalism, republicanism, democracy, socialism, and social democracy. The advocacy of social equality is egalitarianism. Social equality is distinct from alleviating suffering of the unfortunate in society. It is an expression of the ideal that any two individuals in society should be treated with an equal level of respect and have equal right to participate in society without regard for social status or hierarchy.

Social equality often pertains to how individuals relate to one another within a society, though it can also be considered in interactions between societies. Social hierarchies may form between states or their citizens when power disparities exist between them, particularly in the context of globalization. These disparities are often distinct in type as well as scope, as citizens in different states do not share a common community or social environment. As advances are made in social equality, both internationally and within a society, the scope of social equality expands as new forms of social inequality become apparent and new solutions become possible.

Polysemic and protean concept 

At first, according to the distinction made by Aristotle, equality consists of the distinction just between parts relative to a criterion (proportional equality) or pure mathematical equality.

But the multiplicity of objects (individuals and situations) where this applies makes the concept of "social equality" as diversified and multiform as the objects concerned. Despite the impossibility of a simple theoretical definition, the concept has more-and-more found its pertinence in a pragmatic evaluation to be conducted along different axes:

 Geographic: Is social equality conceivable without reference to a territory, to a human society, to the existence of links of solidarity or of responsibility?
 Temporal: Is social equality appreciated in the instant or must it project itself into the future? Does the concept of intergenerational equality make sense (returning to principles of sustainable development)?
 Legal: Does not social equality, founded by the necessary and formal principles of rights, lead it to rapidly prolonging and going beyond them in aid of the examination of the guarantee and the exercise of real rights?
 Political: Social equality in democracy supposes that the right to vote, the freedom of speech, but also the effective possibility of disposing of information and the free exercise of these rights. What about access to education, to treatment, to culture? Societies closed to this point of view are inegalitarian societies.
 Economic: Is equality of resources, strict egalitarianism, necessary to guarantee social justice? Is there a minimum to take into account below which the dignity, merit, and potential of people is not recognized? Even though for many this equality is seen as an impossible ideal, at the default of equality of conditions, must one content oneself with equal opportunity? 
 Anthropological: Ronald Dworkin, in his experience with shells, arrives at the conclusion that the normative principle to aim at is "equal consideration of each person".

Historical examples 
Illustrating the combat fought in favor of this application on many fronts are the following episodes:

 The French Revolution of 1789 in view of the abolition of privileges
 The Bandung Conference and other anticolonialist movements reclaiming a better sharing of the world than that realized between great powers at the Yalta Conference
 The United Nations which – by its specialized institutions – seeks to promote more stable and concrete dialogue and cooperation between its members
 In France, trade union movements (as in 1936) or charitable movements, such as in France that of Abbé Pierre, of International Movement ATD Fourth World
 The appeal to the establishment of equal opportunities appeals to the idea that people must be in the same conditions to try in life (with concrete initiatives, such as that of Muhammad Yunus in favor of microcredit)

Philosophical history 
Early conceptions of social equality appear in Ancient Greek philosophy. The Stoic philosophers believed that human reason is universal. Plato considered natures of equality when building a society in the Republic, including both a monastic equality and equality in depravity. Aristotle also developed a conception of equality, particularly in regard to citizenship, though he rejected the concept of total social equality in favor of social hierarchy. Social equality developed as a practicable element of society in Europe during the Reformation in which traditional religious hierarchies were challenged. The development of post-Reformation political philosophy provided a secular foundation for social equality and political science created empirical systems to analyze social equality in practice.

The contemporary notion of social equality was developed in the 20th century by political philosophers such as John Rawls, Ronald Dworkin, and Amartya Sen. Rawls defined equality through primary goods like liberty, opportunity, respect, and wealth. Dworkin incorporated a concept of responsibility to Rawls' approach, saying that individuals are personally responsible for voluntary decisions but not natural talents or pre-dispositions. Sen rejected Rawls' measurement of resources in favor of capability to function. Robert Nozick is known for his rejection of Rawls' conception of social equality, arguing that the individual who produced a resource is entitled to it, even if this produces unequal results.

Types 
Social equality is a major element of equality for any group in society. Gender equality includes social equality between men, women, and intersex people. It seeks to rectify detriment to social status caused by biological sex as well as inequalities caused by gender roles. Internationally, women are harmed significantly more by a lack of gender equality, resulting in a higher risk of poverty. Racial equality and ethnic equality include social equality between people of different races and ethnic origins. Social equality can also be applied to belief and ideology, including equal social status for people of all political or religious beliefs.

The rights of people with disabilities pertains to social equality. Both physical and mental disabilities can prevent individuals from participating in society at an equal level, due to environmental factors as well as stigmas associated with disability. Social equality includes both the treatment of disabilities and accommodation of people with disabilities to facilitate equal participation in society.

Means 
Economic development and industrialization are correlated with increased social equality. The industrialization process in which a developing country becomes a developed country corresponds to a significant increase in social equality, and further economic development and growth in developed countries corresponds with further increases in social equality. Education and social equality are also correlated, and increased access to education promotes social equality among individuals.

Standards

Ontological 
The standard of equality that states everyone is created equal at birth is called ontological equality. This type of equality can be seen in many different places like the United States Declaration of Independence. This early document, which states many of the values of the United States of America, has this idea of equality embedded in it. It says "all men are created equal, that they are endowed by their Creator with certain unalienable Rights". The statement reflects the philosophy of John Locke and his idea that all are equal in terms of certain natural rights. Although this standard of equality is seen in documents as important as the Declaration of Independence, it is "one not often invoked in policy debates these days". However this notion of equality is often used to justify inequalities such as material inequality. Dalton Conley claims that ontological equality is used to justify material inequality by putting a spotlight on the fact, legitimated by theology, that "the distribution of power and resources here on earth does not matter because all of us are equally children of God and will have to face our maker upon dying". Dalton Conley, the author of You May Ask Yourself, claims that ontological equality can also be used to put forth the notion that poverty is a virtue. Luciano Floridi, author of a book about information, wrote about what he calls the ontological equality principle. His work on information ethics raises the importance of equality when presenting the information.

Opportunity 

Another standard of equality is equality of opportunity, "the idea that everyone has an equal chance to achieve wealth, social prestige, and power because the rules of the game, so to speak, are the same for everyone". This concept can be applied to society by saying that no one has a head start. This means that, for any social equality issue dealing with wealth, social prestige, power, or any of that sort, the equality of opportunity standard can defend the idea that everyone had the same start. This views society almost as a game and any of the differences in equality standards are due to luck and playing the "game" to one's best ability. Conley gives an example of this standard of equality by using a game of Monopoly to describe society. He claims that "Monopoly follows the rules of equality of opportunity" by explaining that everyone had an equal chance when starting the game and any differences were a result of the luck of the dice roll and the skill of the player to make choices to benefit their wealth. Comparing this example to society, the standard of equality of opportunity eliminates inequality because the rules of the games in society are still fair and the same for all, therefore making any existing inequalities in society fair.

Lesley A. Jacobs, the author of Pursuing Equal Opportunities: The Theory and Practice of Egalitarian Justice, talks about equality of opportunity and its importance relating to egalitarian justice. Jacobs states that: at the core of equality of opportunity... is the concept that in competitive procedures designed for the allocation of scarce resources and the distribution of the benefits and burdens of social life, those procedures should be governed by criteria that are relevant to the particular goods at stake in the competition and not by irrelevant considerations such as race, religion, class, gender, disability, sexual orientation, ethnicity, or other factors that may hinder some of the competitors’ opportunities at success. (Jacobs, 10).

This concept points out factors like race, gender, class, etc. that should not be considered when talking about equality through this notion. Conley also mentions that this standard of equality is at the heart of a bourgeois society, such as a modern capitalist society, or "a society of commerce in which the maximization of profit is the primary business incentive".  It was the equal opportunity ideology that civil rights activists adopted in the era of the civil rights movement in the 1960s. This ideology was used by them to argue that Jim Crow laws were incompatible with the standard of equality of opportunity.

Condition 

Another notion of equality introduced by Conley is equality of condition. Through this framework is the idea that everyone should have an equal starting point. Conley goes back to his example of a game of Monopoly to explain this standard. If the game of four started off with two players both having an advantage of $5,000 to start off with and both already owning hotels and other property while the other two players both did not own any property and both started off with a $5,000 deficit, then from a perspective of the standard of equality of condition, one can argue that the rules of the game "need to be altered in order to compensate for inequalities in the relative starting positions".  From this we form policies in order to even equality which in result bring an efficient way to create fairer competition in society. Here is where social engineering comes into play where we change society in order to give an equality of condition to everyone based on race, gender, class, religion, etc. when it is made justifiable that the proponents of the society make it unfair for them.

Sharon E. Kahn, the author of Academic Freedom and the Inclusive University, talks about equality of condition in their work as well and how it correlates to freedom of individuals. They claim that in order to have individual freedom there needs to be equality of condition "which requires much more than the elimination of legal barriers: it requires the creation of a level playing field that eliminates structural barriers to opportunity". Her work talks about the academic structure and its problem with equalities and claims that to "ensure equity... we need to recognize that the university structure and its organizational culture have traditionally privileged some and marginalized other; we need to go beyond theoretical concepts of equality by eliminating systemic barriers that hinder the equal participation of members of all groups; we need to create and equality of condition, not merely an equality of opportunity". "Notions of equity, diversity, and inclusiveness begin with a set of premises about individualism, freedom and rights that take as given the existence of deeply rooted inequalities in social structure," therefore in order to have a culture of the inclusive university, it would have to "be based on values of equity; that is, equality of condition" eliminating all systemic barriers that go against equality.

Outcome 

The fourth standard of equality is equality of outcome, which is "a position that argues each player must end up with the same amount regardless of the fairness". In this standard of equality, the idea is that "everyone contributes to society and to the economy according to what they do best". Under this notion of equality, Conley states that "nobody will earn more power, prestige, and wealth by working harder". Equality of outcome is often falsely conflated with communism or Marxist philosophy despite the fact that these ideologies clearly promote the distribution of resources on the basis of need or contribution (depending on the level of development of a society's productive forces) rather than equality. Vladimir Lenin stated that the "abolition of classes means placing all citizens on an equal footing with regard to the means of production belonging to society as a whole. It means giving all citizens equal opportunities of working on the publicly-owned means of production, on the publicly-owned land, at the publicly-owned factories, and so forth".

When defining equality of outcome in education, "the goals should not be the liberal one of equality of access but equality of outcome for the median number of each identifiable non-educationally defined group, i.e. the average women, negro, or proletarian or rural dweller should have the same level of educational attainment as the average male, white, suburbanite". The outcome and the benefits from equality from education from this notion of equality promotes that all should have the same outcomes and benefits regardless of race, gender, religion etc. The equality of outcome in Hewitt's point of view is supposed to result in "a comparable range of achievements between a specific disadvantaged group – such as an ethnic minority, women, lone parents and the disabled – and society as a whole".

Information ethics is impartial and universal because it brings to ultimate completion the process of enlargement of the concept of what may count as a center of a (no matter how minimal) moral claim, which now includes every instance of being understood informationally, no matter whether physically implemented or not. In this respect, information ethics holds that every entity as an expression of being, has a dignity constituted by its mode of existence and essence (the collection of all the elementary properties that constitute it for what it is), which deserve to be respected (at least in a minimal and overridable sense), and hence place moral claims on the interacting agent and ought to contribute to the constraint and guidance of his ethical decisions and behavior. Floridi goes on to claim that this "ontological equality principle means that any form of reality (any instance of information/being), simply for the fact of being what it is, enjoys a minimal, initial, overridable, equal right to exist and develop in a way which is appropriate to its nature." Values in his claims correlate to those shown in the sociological textbook You May Ask Yourself by Dalton Conley. The notion of "ontological equality" describes equality by saying everything is equal by nature. Everyone is created equal at birth. Everything has an equal right to exist and develop by its nature.

References

Further reading

 Arnold, Mathew (18759). "Equality." In: Mixed Essays. New York: Macmillan & Co., pp. 48–97.
 
 Bryce, James (1898). "Equality," The Century; A Popular Quarterly, Vol. 56, No. 3, pp. 459–469.
 Dreikurs, Rudolf (1983). Social Equality; The Challenge of Today. Chicago, IL: Alfred Adler Institute of Chicago.
 Gil, David G. (1976). The Challenge of Social Equality. Cambridge: Schenkman Pub. Co.
 Hyneman, Charles S. (1980). "Equality: Elusive Ideal or Beguiling Delusion?," The Modern Age, Vol. XXIV, No. 3, pp. 226–237.
 Jackman, Robert W. (1975). Politics and Social Equality. New York: Wiley.
 Lane, Robert E. (1959). "The Fear of Equality," The American Political Science Review, Vol. 53, No. 1, pp. 35–51.
 Lucas, J.R. (1965). "Against Equality," Philosophy, Vol. 40, pp. 296–307.
 Lucas, J.R. (1977). "Against Equality Again," Philosophy, Vol. 52, pp. 255–280.
 Mallock, William H. (1882). Social Equality: A Short Study in a Missing Science. London: Richard Bentley and Son.
 Merwin, Henry Childs (1897). "The American Notion of Equality," The Atlantic Monthly, Vol. 80, pp. 354–363.
 Nagel, Thomas (1978). "The Justification of Equality," Crítica: Revista Hispanoamericana de Filosofía, Vol. 10, No. 28, pp. 3–31.
 
 
 Rothbard, Murray N. (1995). "Egalitarianism and the Elites," The Review of Austrian Economics, Vol. 8, No. 2, pp. 39–57.
 Rougier, Louis (1974). "Philosophical Origins of the Idea of Natural Equality," The Modern Age, Vol. XVIII, No. 1, pp. 29–38.
 Stephen, James Fitzjames (1873). "Equality." In: Liberty, Equality, Fraternity. New York: Holt & Williams, pp. 189–255.
 Stephen, Leslie (1891). "Social Equality," International Journal of Ethics, Vol. 1, No. 3, pp. 261–288.
 Tonsor, Stephen J. (1979). "Liberty and Equality as Absolutes," The Modern Age, Vol. XXIII, No. 1, pp. 2–9.
 Tonsor, Stephen J. (1980). "Equality and Ancient Society," The Modern Age, Vol. XXIV, No. 2, pp. 134–141.
 Tonsor, Stephen J. (1980). "Equality in the New Testament," The Modern Age, Vol. XXIV, No. 4, pp. 345–354.
 Tonsor, Stephen J. (1980). "The New Natural Law and the Problem of Equality," The Modern Age, Vol. XXIV, No. 3, pp. 238–247.
 Tonsor, Stephen J. (1981). "Equality: The Greek Historical Experience," The Modern Age, Vol. XXV, No. 1, pp. 46–55.
 Velasco, Gustavo R. (1974). "On Equality and Egalitarianism," The Modern Age, Vol. XVIII, No. 1, pp. 21–28.

External links
 

Social systems
Distribution of wealth
Egalitarianism
Social inequality